Jorman Israel Aguilar Bustamante (born 11 September 1994) is a Panamanian footballer who plays as a striker.

Career
Born in Panama City, Aguilar made his senior debuts with hometown's Río Abajo, and after netting ten times in only 18 matches he joined Italian Serie A side Parma. However, in July he was loaned to Nova Gorica.

On 27 July 2013 Aguilar made his professional debut, playing the last 30 minutes in a 1–2 home loss against Domžale. On 11 February of the following year he moved teams and countries again, joining Istra 1961 also in a temporary deal.

In January 2015 he was signed by Independiente Chorrera.

In 2022, he joined Bucheon FC 1995 of K League 2. He left the club at the end of the season.

International career
He made his debut for Panama in a March 2015  friendly match against Trinidad and Tobago.

References

External links
 

  

1994 births
Living people
Sportspeople from Panama City
Panamanian footballers
Panama international footballers
Association football forwards
Parma Calcio 1913 players
ND Gorica players
NK Istra 1961 players
S.C. Olhanense players
C.A. Independiente de La Chorrera players
Tauro F.C. players
G.D. Estoril Praia players
A.D. San Carlos footballers
Sport Boys footballers
Bucheon FC 1995 players
Liga Panameña de Fútbol players
Slovenian PrvaLiga players
Liga Portugal 2 players
Primeira Liga players
Liga FPD players
Peruvian Primera División players
K League 2 players
Panamanian expatriate footballers
Expatriate footballers in Italy
Expatriate footballers in Slovenia
Expatriate footballers in Croatia
Expatriate footballers in Portugal
Expatriate footballers in Costa Rica
Expatriate footballers in Peru
Expatriate footballers in South Korea
Panamanian expatriate sportspeople in Italy
Panamanian expatriate sportspeople in Slovenia
Panamanian expatriate sportspeople in Croatia
Panamanian expatriate sportspeople in Portugal
Panamanian expatriate sportspeople in Costa Rica
Panamanian expatriate sportspeople in Peru
Panamanian expatriate sportspeople in South Korea
Footballers at the 2015 Pan American Games
Pan American Games competitors for Panama
2021 CONCACAF Gold Cup players